Buddy Baumann may refer to:

Buddy Baumann (American football) (1900–1951), American football player
Buddy Baumann (baseball) (born 1987), American baseball player